Talmai ('my furrows') is a name in the Bible referring to a number of minor people. Its Aramaic version was associated with the Greek Ptolemy (see that article for the list of corresponding names and surnames), and is the origin of Bartholomew.

Talmai and his brothers, the Nephilim
Talmai, Ahiman and Sheshai were Nephilim, three giant sons of Anak whom Caleb and the spies saw in Mount Hebron (Book of Numbers 13:22) when they went in to explore the land. They were afterwards driven out and slain (Joshua 15:14; Judges 1:10).

Talmai, father of Maacah
King of Geshur. His daughter Maacah (מַעֲכָה) was a wife to the king David of Israel, mother of Tamar and Absalom.  After slaying Amnon (for the rape of Tamar), Absalom fled to Talmai in Geshur for three years.

Rephaites
Monarchs of the Hebrew Bible
Absalom
Books of Samuel people
Anakim
Nephilim